Melaleuca eximia is a plant in the myrtle family, Myrtaceae and is endemic to the south of Western Australia. It is distinguished by its leaf arrangement, its large, showy red inflorescences and the large, furry bracts under the flowers.

Description
Its leaves are crowded and arranged in alternating pairs at right angles to the ones above and below so that there are four rows of leaves along the stems.

The flowers are bright red and arranged in spikes on the sides of the branches. At the base of each group of flowers there is a furry, heart-shaped  bract. There are five bundles of stamens around the flower, each with 11 to 14 stamens.

Taxonomy and naming
The first formal description of this plant was made in 1990 by Kirsten Cowley in  Australian Systematic Botany as Melaleuca coccinea subsp. eximia from a specimen collected near Esperance. It was raised to species status as Meleleuca eximia in 1999 by Lyndley Craven in Australian Systematic Botany. The specific epithet (eximia) is from the Latin eximius meaning "exceptional" or "extraordinary", referring to the appearance of the plant in flower.

Distribution and habitat
Melaleuca eximia occurs in a small area near Esperance in the Esperance Plains and Mallee biogeographic regions, growing in gravelly sand or clay near granite outcrops.

Conservation status
This melaleuca is listed as "Priority Two" by the Government of Western Australia Department of Parks and Wildlife, meaning that it is known from only a few locations but is not currently in imminent danger.

Use in horticulture
The leaves and flowers of this species make this an attractive plant for the garden. It has been grown in South Australia and proven to be hardy in drier climates when grown in soil that is slightly acid.

References

eximia
Plants described in 1990
Endemic flora of Western Australia
Taxa named by Lyndley Craven